Gigandet is a surname. Notable people with the surname include:
 
Cam Gigandet (born 1982), American actor
Xavier Gigandet (born 1966), Swiss alpine skier

See also
Mireille Gigandet-Donders (born 1974), retired Swiss athlete who specialised in sprinting events